Melaka Aerorail is a proposed monorail line to be constructed in Malacca City. It will be constructed in two phases, 9.5 km for the first one with another at 8.7 km. The cost of construction is expected to be around RM1.8 Billion. If it is successful, it will be the first aerorail network in Malaysia and Asia. The project, however, has been postponed indefinitely.

Stations

First phase
The first phase costs around RM586 million, involving a distance of 9.5 km. It includes the construction of 10 transit stations starting from the Ayer Keroh Toll Plaza, Zoo Melaka, Melaka International Trade Centre (MITC), Malacca Historic City Council Square (MBMB), Melaka Mall, Hospital Melaka, Melaka Sentral Station, Hang Tuah Mall, Big Clock Tower (Building Stadthuys) and crown Medical Centre (Heroes' Square) and end at Dataran Pahlawan in Bandar Hilir.

The project also involves a stopover (hotel) in each station, producing 2,500 rooms for accommodation. These hotels will be managed by the Leisure Group Hotels & Resorts Sdn Bhd. It is scheduled for completion in the first quarter of 2012.

The project was supposed to commence in 2010.

Second phase
The second phase costs around RM807 million, involving a distance of 8.7 kilometers. The project, if successful, will be extended to Alor Gajah and Jasin district.

Management
Pyramid Express will build, operate and manage the Aerorail system. Technical and project management support will come from Pinggiran Pelangi Sdn Bhd.

Criticism
Association for the Improvement of Mass-Transit-Klang Valley - TRANSIT criticises the project and urge the state's government to improve its public bus service first. The project were also have been criticised by the Melaka Opposition member.

See also
 Monorails in Malaysia
 Kuala Lumpur Monorail
 Melaka Monorail
 Public transport in Kuala Lumpur
 List of rapid transit systems
 List of monorail systems

References

Monorails in Malaysia
Proposed rail infrastructure in Malaysia